Kerry Mitchell (born 1961) is an American artist known for his algorithmic and fractal art, which has been exhibited at  the Nature in Art Museum, The Bridges Conference, and the Los Angeles Center for Digital Art, and for his "Fractal Art Manifesto".

Life

Mitchell was born in Iowa, United States, in 1961. His parents were LeRoy and Shirley Mitchell. His father was an art teacher and mother was a stay-at-home mother until Mitchell started seventh grade. Mitchell was a Presidential Scholar in 1979 and went on to pursue engineering at and graduated from Purdue University in aerospace engineering, did a master's degree at Stanford University, and then a PhD work at Purdue. He worked at NASA doing aerospace research. He then worked as a scientist at Arizona Science Center. He served as a mathematics and science professor at the University of Advancing Technology in Tempe, Arizona. As of 2015, he works as a manager at Maricopa County Community College District in  Tempe, Arizona.

Artwork

Alongside his technical career, Mitchell works on algorithmic art. He ascribes his artistic awakening to a 1985 article in Scientific American on the Mandelbrot set, explaining:

In 1999, Mitchell published his Fractal Art Manifesto. The artist Janet Parke notes that in the manifesto, Mitchell suggests that fractal art cannot be made by a computer alone, and that not everyone who has a computer can necessarily make good fractal art. Instead, she explains, Mitchell is arguing that the artist's creative process is needed to inject elements such as the considered selection of colours and gradients, the merging of multiple layers, and decisions on composition such as by zooming in to a fractal.

Mitchell also prepared tutorials on how to create fractal art with tools including Ultra Fractal. In 2011 he served on the panel of the "Fractal Art Contest".

Exhibitions, collections
 Nature in Art Museum, Gloucestershire, 2007
 The Bridges Conference, 2015
 Los Angeles Center for Digital Art (LACDA), 2015-2016

Works

Books
 Selected Works (self-published with Lulu.com), 2009.

Papers
 Fractal Art Manifesto, 1999
 Introduction to Ultra Fractal version 2, 2001
 Using Ultra Fractal as a Drawing Tool, 2001
 Techniques for Artistically Rendering Space-Filling Curves
 A Statistical Investigation of the Area of the Mandelbrot Set, 2001
 Rendering Fractal Images using Photographs, 2001
 Modeling Vortical Flows
 Fractal Tessellations and the Pythagorean Theorem
 Sequences and Patterns Arising from Mancala on an Infinite Board
 Toward a Chaotic World View 
 Transcendental Signature Sequences
 Fun with Chaotic Orbits in the Mandelbrot Set 
 Spirolateral Images from Integer Sequences 
 Fun with Whirls

References

External links
 Kerry Mitchell website
  Mathematical Imagery at the American Mathematical Society
 Fine Art America: Kerry Mitchell

1961 births
Living people
Artists from Iowa
Purdue University alumni
Stanford University alumni
American digital artists
Mathematical artists
Algorithmic art